Prince Imhae (20 September 1572 – 3 June 1609; personal name Yi Jin, childhood name Yi Jin-Guk), was a Joseon Royal Prince as the eldest son of King Seonjo and the elder brother of King Gwanghae. He was known for have such a violent and arrogant personality, which he murdered some government officials alongside his half brothers: Prince Jeongwon (정원군) and Prince Sunhwa (순화군), but were survived under their father's protection. Also, when his depravity lead to government officials demanded severe punishment for his actions, he was able avoid such punishment by his father's protection too.

However, he was passed over for the Crown Prince's role in favour of his younger brother who would eventually take the throne and became King Gwanghae. After investigated for crimes he committed against common people, he was sent into exile to Gyodong County after the Imjin war, then died in 1609.

Early life and marriage
He was born on 20 September 1572 as the first and oldest son of King Seonjo, by his concubine, Lady Gim with the name of Yi Jin-guk (later changed into Yi Jin). But, when he was only 6 years old, she died in 1577. As a result, he and his younger brother were raised by Seonjo's primary wife, Queen Uiin who was childless at this time. Different from him, his brother was said to not have a good relationship with the Queen due to his birth mother's face.

He then married the daughter of Heo-Myeong (허명), Lady Heo from the "Yangcheon Heo clan" in 1585. In 1591, both of him, Prince Gwanghae (광해군), Prince Sinseong (신성군), Prince Jeongwon (정원군) and Prince Sunhwa (순화군) became Gwanggigwonjonggongsin (광국원종공신).

During the Imjin War

At the time of Imjin War
During the start of the Imjin War in 1592 (25th year of the reign of King Seonjo), he lost his position as Crown Prince (왕세자, 王世子) due to his violent personality. He would later be faced with a miserable end after the throne was instead handed over to his younger brother, Gwanghae. After being passed over for the position of Crown Prince, he was sent Hamgyeong-do with Prince Sunhwa (순화군) to recruit the Geunwang Soldiers (근왕병).

However, on 23 July in the same year, both of Imhae and Sunhwa were captured by local Inspector in Hoe-ryeong,  Hamgyeong-do. They were eventually released after series negotiations. Gim Hui-Cheol (김희철), Imhae and Gwanghae's maternal grandfather had also died during the War.

After the Imjin War
Yi Jin acted arrogantly and violently by used his high status. Some officers also said that he always acted so arrogant and always caused various problems. Meanwhile, there was some who asked for his crime and want him to severely punished due to his acts such as assaulting an innocent person or killing a person even if they just had a minor resentment. After that, he and his half-brother were constantly impeached, but they were safe.

When Gwanghae took over the throne, appeals for his punishment and expulsion came up one after another. Afterwards, Uigeumbu (의금부, 義禁府) followed Gwanghae's instructions and they punished Yi Jin, Gi Ja-heon (기자헌) and Yi Heung-ro (이흥로). Meanwhile, Hong Mun-gwan (홍문관) raised some mantras to advocated the death penalty of Imhae. Afterwards, he was exiled again to Gyodong-gun. Based on "Gwanghaegun's Diary" (광해군일기), Yi Jeong-pyo (이정표) a soldier, who guarded him in the exile, was suspected to have forced him drink poison, but after the rebellion, a servant of Imhae testified that he was, in fact, strangled to death. There was also a re-investigation in 1623 which concluded that he was murdered by an assassin sent by Yi Yi-cheom (이이첨), then reinstated under King Injo's command.

Debate of children
There is debated that the Prince's children were detained in Japan by Katō Kiyomasa and became monks or the wives of their general. But since there is no evidence to support the detention of his children, so it cannot be said if it is true.

Family
Father: Seonjo of Joseon (조선 선조; 1552–1608)
Grandfather: Grand Internal Prince Deokheung (덕흥대원군; 1530–1559)
Grandmother: Grand Internal Princess Consort Hadong of the Hadong Jeong clan (하동부대부인 정씨; 1522–1567)
Mother: Royal Noble Consort Gong of the Gimhae Gim clan (공빈 김씨; 1553–1577)
Grandfather: Gim Hui-cheol, Internal Prince Haeryeong (김희철 해령부원군; 1519–1592)
Grandmother: Lady, of the Andong Gwon clan (정경부인 안동권씨)
Younger brother: Crown Prince Yi Hon (왕세자 이혼; 1575–1641)
Younger-sister-in-law: Crown Princess Consort, of the Munhwa Yu clan (왕세자빈 문화유씨; 1576–1523)
Wife: Princess Consort, of the Yangcheon Heo clan (군부인 양천허씨; 26 July 1571 – 15 October 1644) – daughter of Heo-Myeong (허명).
Unnamed daughter; died prematurely
Yi Tae-ung (이태웅; 1589–1665) – an Iryeon Buddhist (일연스님)
Yi Jun, Prince Changwon (이준 창원군) – adoptive son
Yi Gyeong, Prince Yangnyeong (이경 양녕군; 1616–1644) – adoptive son

In popular culture

Drama & Television series
Portrayed by Kim Mu-saeng in the 1982 MBC TV Series Woman Exhibition in the West Palace? (여인열전 - 서궁마마).
Portrayed by Jung Sung-mo in the 1985–1986 MBC TV Series The Imjin War.
Portrayed by Im Jung-ha in the 1986 MBC TV Series The Hoechun Gate.
Portrayed by Im Hyuk-joo in the 1995 KBS2 TV Series West Palace.
Portrayed by Lee Won-bal in the 2000–2001 KBS2 TV Series Roll of Thunder.
Portrayed by Kim Yu-seok in the 2003–2004 SBS TV Series The King's Woman.
Portrayed by Lee Kwang-soo and Lee In-sung in the 2013 MBC TV Series Goddess of Fire.
Portrayed by Park Joo-hyung in the 2014–2015 KBS2 TV series The King's Face.
Portrayed by Yoon Hong-bin in the 2015 KBS1 TV series The Jingbirok: A Memoir of Imjin War.
Portrayed by Choi Jong-hwan in the 2015 MBC TV series Splendid Politics.

Film
Portrayed by Kim Seung-ho in the 1962 South Korean film Queen Dowager Inmok.

References

Prince Imhae on Encykorea .

Korean princes
House of Yi
1572 births
1609 deaths
16th-century Korean people
17th-century Korean people